Wuhan Road station may refer to:

 Wuhan Road station (Chengdu Metro), a station on the Chengdu Metro in Chengdu, Sichuan Province, China
 Wuhan Road station (Luoyang Subway), a station on Line 1 of the Luoyang Subway in Luoyang, Henan Province, China.